The IAI Harop is a loitering munition developed by the MBT division of Israel Aerospace Industries. Loitering munitions are designed to loiter above the battlefield and attack targets by crashing into them and exploding.

Overview
The IAI Harop has a loiter (flying) time of 6 hours and a range of 1,000 km both ways. It is a larger version of the IAI Harpy and is launched from ground or sea-based canisters, but can be adapted for air launch. The Harop uses a man-in-the-loop mode, being controlled by a remote operator. The Harop operator can select static or moving targets detected by the aircraft's electro-optical sensor.

IAI developed a smaller version of the Harop for smaller applications called Mini-Harop or Green Dragon. The smaller Harop is one-fifth the size and has a lighter  warhead. It has a shorter endurance of 2–3 hours and is used tactically against time-critical targets or ones that hide and re-appear.

History
Turkey may have been the launch customer for the Harop in 2005. In October 2005, MBDA submitted the Harop (under the name "White Hawk") to the United Kingdom's Ministry of Defence for consideration as the system for the Ministry's Loitering Munition Capability Demonstration (LMCD) program, otherwise known as "Fire Shadow". The Harop was selected as one of the finalists but was rejected when the MoD decided that the contract should go to a British team.

In August 2007, the government of India was negotiating to purchase eight to ten Harop systems. In September 2009, the Indian Air Force announced that it will be inducting the Harop systems purchased for US$100 million "for up to 10 drones". The Harop was publicly unveiled to the world for the first time in India, in the lead-up to the Aero India 2009 show. In February 2019, the Indian Air Force decided to add another 54 Harop drones to its fleet of around 110 of these drones, which they had renamed P-4.

Combat history  
It was first used in combat by Azerbaijan in the Nagorno-Karabakh conflict in April 2016. IAI Harop drones operated by Azerbaijan were used to destroy buses of Armenian soldiers being transported to the frontline. The loitering drones were also reportedly used to destroy an Armenian command post. In April 2018, IAI systems were observed in a film made by the Azerbaijan Army, specifically the IAI Harop loitering munition system, resulting in criticism from the Armenian government concerning the supply of Israeli arms to the Azerbaijan Army. The Israeli Defense Forces Harop was also credited for destroying a Syrian Air Defence SA-22 Greyhound on 10 May 2018. It was also used by the Azerbaijan Air Force in the 2020 Nagorno-Karabakh conflict. In 2020, Hikmet Hajiyev, an advisor to Azerbaijani President Ilham Aliyev, praised the effectiveness of the Harop in the 2020 Nagorno-Karabakh conflict.

Operators

 
  (only test runs, no transition to regular use)

Specifications

See also
IAI Harpy
SEAD
UCAV

References

External links

 HAROP - Loitering Munition System IAI website. Retrieved 2020-10-09.
 
 
  
 
  
 New IDF UAV revealed (video)  

Canard aircraft
Delta-wing aircraft
Harop
2000s Israeli military reconnaissance aircraft
Single-engined pusher aircraft
Harop
Wankel-engined aircraft
Loitering munition